An antecedent is a stimulus that cues an organism to perform a learned behavior.  When an organism perceives an antecedent stimulus, it behaves in a way that maximizes reinforcing consequences and minimizes punishing consequences. This might be part of complex, interpersonal communication.

Antecedent stimuli (paired with reinforcing consequences) activate centers of the brain involved in motivation, while antecedent stimuli that have been paired with punishing consequences activate brain centers involved in fear. Antecedents play a different role while attempting to trigger positive and negative outcomes. 

There are some scientific papers  that argue that there are two different types of antecedent variables. These two types of antecedent variables are referred to as discriminative stimuli and setting events. Setting events differ from discriminative stimuli as setting events are believed to have an effect on the stimulus-response relationship. It has been suggested that setting events focus on three categories of stimuli (biological, physical and social variables). Discriminative stimuli are found to be present “when a behavior is reinforced”. The discriminative stimuli is believed to be the identifying event alerting the mind that a reinforcement will occur in exchange for a specific behavior.

Stimuli that activate the "motivation" part of the brain have been tested through areas of competition in certain categories like, for example, tourism places. There are a few factors that can lead to competition changes in tourism, like hospitality, food selections, cleanliness, and more. These areas of concentration (resources, facilities, etc.) are the stimuli that would be considered the second variable--setting events. This type of competitiveness affects not only where the tourists are planning on visiting, but it also affects the employees that work in tourist towns. Things like gift shops, hotels, and restaurants depend on the flow of tourism to keep their businesses thriving. This makes businesses continuously improve and change their business ways to meet consumer demands. All of these variables change the behavior of all parties involved.

References

Behavioral concepts